Froggattisca is a genus of cave-dwelling antlions, that is, the genus belongs to the family Myrmeleontidae. 

The genus was first described by Peter Esben-Petersen in 1915.  The genus name honours W.W. Froggatt who, in  1900 at Colo Vale, NSW, collected the female specimen described by Esben-Petersen as Froggattisca pulchella.

Miller and Stange describe members of the genus as not being true cave-dwelling antlions, because  not all life stages are confined to caves. The genus is found only in Australia. Froggattisca larvae are found on the floors of cave mouths in shallow dust or loose material.

This genus consists of approximately nine species:
Froggattisca anicis New, 1985
Froggattisca gemma New, 1985
Froggattisca kakadu Miller and Stange, 2012
Froggattisca pulchella Esben-Petersen, 1915
Froggattisca radiostriata New, 1985	
Froggattisca rennerensis Miller and Stange, 2012
Froggattisca rieki New, 1985
Froggattisca testacea (Esben-Petersen, 1923)
Froggattisca tipularia (Gerstaecker, 1885)

Description 
Froggattisca species have: 

 larvae whose
 pretarsal claws close against the ventral setae;
tibial spurs are absent or very short;
 adults whose
hindwings have one or two presectoral crossveins;
hind femurs with no elongated sensing hair.

References

External links
Froggattisca: images & occurrence data from GBIF

Myrmeleontidae
Insects described in 1915